Timothy John Phillip Hubbard is a Professor of Bioinformatics at King's College London, Head of Genome Analysis at Genomics England and Honorary Faculty at the Wellcome Trust Sanger Institute in Cambridge, UK.

Education
Hubbard was educated at the University of Cambridge where he was awarded a Bachelor of Arts degree in Natural Sciences (Biochemistry) in 1985. He went on to do research in protein design in the Department of Crystallography, Birkbeck College, London where he was awarded a PhD in 1988 for research supervised by Tom Blundell.

Research and career
Hubbard's research interests are in Bioinformatics, Computational biology and Genome Informatics. During his tenure at WTSI he supervised several successful PhD students to completion in these areas of research.

Hubbard was appointed Professor of Bioinformatics at King's in October 2013. His research has been published in leading peer reviewed scientific journals including Nature, the Journal of Molecular Biology, Nucleic Acids Research, Genome Biology, Nature Methods, Nature Reviews Cancer and Bioinformatics. His research been funded by the Medical Research Council (MRC) and the Biotechnology and Biological Sciences Research Council (BBSRC).

References

Living people
British bioinformaticians
Alumni of Clare College, Cambridge
Academics of King's College London
Year of birth missing (living people)